Hungarian shamanism is discovered through comparative methods in ethnology, designed to analyse and search ethnographic data of Hungarian folktales, songs, language, comparative cultures, and historical sources.

Research
Studies of files of witch trials reveal that some features of Hungarian folklore are remnants of shamanistic beliefs, maintained from the deep past, or possibly borrowed from Turkic peoples with whom Hungarians lived before wandering to the Pannonian Basin; or maybe is an effect of Eastern influence thereafter (Cuman immigration).

These remnants are partly conserved as fragments by some features of customs and beliefs, for example
 refrains of certain folksongs accompanying some customs;
 certain motifs of folktales, e.g. sky-reaching tree, which was a specific belief among several central Eurasian peoples, having some resemblances to the world tree concept, but it was also related to the shaman's tree and had some other peculiarities as well.

Characteristics
There were also people who filled similar roles to those performed by shamans among other peoples: fortune-telling, weather magic, finding lost objects. These people are related to shamanism (in contrast to the cunning folk of non-shamanistic cultures), because the former are recorded to go through similar experiences to those of many shamans: being born with physical anomalies such as a surplus amount of bones or teeth, illness, dismemberment by a mythological being and recovering with greater or increased capabilities, or struggle with other shamans or beings.

Related features can be recognized in several examples of shamanism in Siberia. As the Hungarian language belongs to the Uralic family, we can expect to find them among other peoples who speak Uralic languages. Some of them maintained shamanism until modern times; the isolated location of Nganasan people made it possible that shamanism was a living phenomenon among them even at the beginning of 20th century. The last notable Nganasan shaman's seances were recorded on film in the 1970s.

The original location of the Proto-Uralic peoples (and its extent) is debated. The combined results of several sciences suggest that this area was north of Central Ural Mountains and on lower and middle parts of the Ob River. This approach combined ecological, namely phytogeographical and paleobotanic (including palynological) data together with linguistic (phytonymic and comparative) considerations: the distribution of various tree species in Siberia and Eastern Europe (changing over time) was matched against the distribution of the respective tree-names in various Uralic languages (filtered with comparative methods, so that only names of Proto-Uralic relevance be taken into account).

Artifacts 
Some artifacts, see online available pictures and descriptions:
 Sky-reaching tree standing on a hill, with a celestial body top left, and cattle on both lower and upper levels. Aso, Diószegi Vilmos identified a shamanic ladder on the image. Decoration of a horn saltcellar, collected in Biharnagybajom village of Hajdú-Bihar county. The figure about the artifact (together with other related ones) is drawn by Szűcs Sándor ethnographer. See online.
 Combat of two táltos people (both in the guise of bulls). Decoration on corn saltcellar, collected in Sárrét. The artifact is drawn by ethnographer Szűcs Sándor. See online. Another image depicts táltos people fighting as black and white bulls, one of them helped by a man. Drawn by Dudás Juló, Galgamácsa. Not online.

Soul dualism 
Soul dualism can be observed in several cultures in many variations: people are believed to have more than one soul. Examples can be found in several north Eurasian cultures and in some Inuit groups as well as Hungarians. Some of the many examples distinguish two souls: a body soul for maintaining bodily functions, and a free soul which can leave the body (even during life), with great variations on this theme among cultures.

In some cultures, it may be related to shamanic concepts.  In shamanistic beliefs of some Inuit groups, the shaman's "spirit journey", with his helping spirits, to remote places is explained with such soul concepts. It is the shaman's free soul that leaves his body. According to an explanation, this temporal absence of the shaman's free soul is tracked by a substitute: the shaman's body is guarded by one of his/her helping spirits during the spirit journey, also a legend contains this motif while describing a spirit journey undertaken by the shaman's free soul and his helping spirits.

As mentioned, it was also observed among Hungarians. The body soul, lélek was related to breathing (shown by etymology). The shadow soul called íz was related to the roaming soul of the dead. Its feared nature can be seen, as it features also in curse expressions: “Vigyen el az íz!” (= “the shadow soul take you!”). This curse is unknown for most people nowadays, and word "íz" (in this meaning) is also unknown, or felt as an archaism with forgotten meaning.

See also 
 Táltos
 Hungarian mythology

Notes

References 
  The tale title means: "The land of the dead in the sky"; the book title means: Eskimo tales; the series means: “Tales of World Literature”.
  The title means: Uralic peoples. Culture and traditions of our linguistic relatives; the chapter means “The Hungarians at the time of entering the Carpathian Basin, and their ancient beliefs”.
  The title means: Remnants of Shamanistic Beliefs in Hungarian Folklore.

  Hungarian translation of the original: Vie et coutumes des Esquimaux Caribous, Libraire Payot Lausanne, 1944. It describes the life of Caribou Eskimo and Padlermiut groups.
  The title means: Uralic Peoples. Culture and traditions of our linguistic relatives; the chapter means “Linguistic background of the relationship”.
  The title means: “Uralic peoples. Culture and traditions of our linguistic relatives”; the chapter means “The belief system of Uralic peoples and the shamanism”.
  Title means: “Shamans, souls and symbols”.
  The title means “Shamans in Eurasia”, the book is written in Hungarian, but it is published also in German, Estonian and Finnish. Site of publisher with short description on the book (in Hungarian)
 
  Translation of the chapter: "Our ancient homes and wanderings", translation of the title: Finno-Ugric guide.
 
 
  The title means: “The belief systems of our linguistic relatives in Siberia”.

Further reading 
 Ildikó Boldizsár. "Shamanic Elements in Hungarian Folk Tales – An Excerpt from Fairy Tale Therapy". In: Hungarian Review IV/2013, n. 06, pp. 92–101.
 Fazekas, Jenö (1967). “Hungarian Shamanism, Material and History of Research”. In: Scripta Instituti Donneriani Aboensis 1 (August): 97-119. https://doi.org/10.30674/scripta.67026.
 Hoppál, Mihály. “Shamanism and the Belief System of the Ancient Hungarians”. In: Ethnographica et folkloristica carpathica 11 (1999): 58-68.

External links 
  See also homepage of author with other publications.
Terebess Ázsia E-Tár:
 Bartha Júlia: A Kunság népi kultúrájának keleti elemei
 Lux Éva: Sámándobok és húsvéti tojások
Magyar Néprajz:
 Magyar Néprajz, chapter “Természetfeletti képességű emberek – tudósok és közetítők” (people of supernatural abilities – cunning people and mediators)
 Magyar Néprajz, chapter “Világkép” (world view)
 Magyar Néprajz, list of figures
:
 
 

European shamanism
Hungarian mythology
Hungarian prehistory